Lars Hansson Fykerud (5 April 1860 – 19 August 1902) was a Norwegian Hardanger fiddler and composer. He was born in Sauherad; the son of folk musician Hans G. Fykerud and Torbjørg Larsdotter. Fykerud played the fiddle in the tradition of Knut Luraas, Håvard Gibøen and Myllarguten, and composed new tunes based on traditional folk music. A memorial of him is raised at Bø Church in Telemark, and he was biographed by H. Braaten in 1939.

References

1860 births
1902 deaths
People from Sauherad
Norwegian folk musicians
Norwegian fiddlers
Male violinists
Norwegian composers
Norwegian male composers
19th-century male musicians